Abwein  is a Palestinian village in the Ramallah and al-Bireh Governorate, located about 37 kilometers north of Ramallah in the northern West Bank. According to the Palestinian Central Bureau of Statistics, Abwein's population was 3,119 in 2007.

Abwein's main agricultural products are olives, figs, grapes, apples, peaches, pears, and vegetables. There are three schools in the town with about 1,200 students and about 200 students are enrolled in various Palestinian universities. Abwein also has three mosques, the largest of which is the Farouk Mosque.

Location
Abwein is  located 14.3 km north of Ramallah. It is bordered by Jilijliya  and Sinjil  to the east, Ammuriya and Al-Lubban ash-Sharqiya  to the north, Bani Zeid ash Sharqiya to the west, and Atara  to the south.

History
Pottery sherds from  Iron Age II,   Persian,  Hellenistic, Byzantine, and  Crusader/Ayyubid era have been found.

Reinhold Röhricht identified Abwein as the Crusader village of Casale Bubil or Casale Bubin.

In the village is an old maqam (holy man's tomb) called ash-Shaykh Ya'qub. According to Moshe Sharon, the tomb has been neglected. The tombstone was in secondary use in a terrace. It had an inscription dating to September 1339 in  Mamluk naskhi script dedicated to a Hajji Ya'qub, son of Shaikh Dawud ibn Ahmad, who died that year. It also refers to the Mamluk sultan of that time period, al-Nasir Muhammad. Pottery sherds from the Mamluk era and a hoard of 406 silver coins, mostly from the period of Sultan Baibars, have also been found.

Ottoman era
The village was incorporated into the Ottoman Empire in 1517 with all of Palestine, and in 1596 it appeared in the Ottoman tax registers as being in the nahiya (subdistrict) of Quds, part of the liwa (district) of Quds. It had a population of 53 households, all Muslims. The villagers paid a fixed tax rate of 33.3% on wheat, barley, olive trees, vineyards, fruit trees, goats and/or beehives; a total of 8,750 akçe.  All of the revenue went to a Waqf.

In 1838 it was noted as a Muslim village in the  Bani Zeid administrative region.

In 1870 Victor Guérin visited the village, which he called "A'youein",  and estimated it to have about 300 inhabitants. He described it as having abundant water-sources, beautiful walnut trees, and gardens with figs, olives and pomegranates.  An Ottoman village list of about the same year, 1870, showed that Abwein had 158 houses and a population of 429, though the population count included men only.

In 1882, the PEF's Survey of Western Palestine described Abwein as a village situated on the slope of a hill, with a well to the south, and olive trees on its lower north side.

In 1896 the population of  Abwain was estimated to be about 933 persons.

British Mandate era
In the  1922 census of Palestine conducted by the British Mandate authorities, Abwein had a population of 543 Muslims,  increasing in the 1931 census to 695, still all Muslim, in 171 houses.

In the  1945 statistics  the population was 880  Muslims,  while the total land area was 16,205 dunams, according to an official land and population survey. Of  this,  1,863  were allocated  for plantations and irrigable land, 8,296 for cereals, while 36 dunams were classified as built-up areas.

Jordanian era
In the wake of the 1948 Arab–Israeli War, and after the 1949 Armistice Agreements,  Abwein came  under Jordanian rule.

The Jordanian census of 1961 found 1,174 inhabitants.

1967, aftermath
Since the Six-Day War in 1967, Abwein has been under Israeli occupation.

After the 1995 accords, 79.8% of  village land is defined as  Area A land, 9,2% as Area B, and the remainder 11% as  Area C.

The Sahweil Castle in Abwein was renovated in 1996. In 2005, a 13-member municipality was established by the Palestinian National Authority to administer the town's civil affairs. In the December 2004 Palestinian municipal elections, 28 candidates competed for the mayoral seat and despite strong opposition from religious parties, Fatima Sahweil, a member of Fatah and principal of a local girls' high school, won. The Fatah list won a total of 12 of Abwein Municipality's 13 seats.

Most of Abwein's current inhabitants belong to the Sahweil and Mazahim families. According to the 'Abwein Municipal Council, the town's inhabitants are descendants of Abu Ayyub al-Ansari tribe.

See also
Bani Zeid al-Sharqiya

References

Bibliography

External links
Welcome To 'Abwein/'Ibwein
Abwein, Welcome to Palestine
Survey of Western Palestine, Map 14:  IAA, Wikimedia commons 
‘Abwein Town Profile,  Applied Research Institute–Jerusalem (ARIJ)
 Abwein aerial photo, ARIJ
 Throne villages, with Sahweil Palace in Ibwein, RIWAQ

Villages in the West Bank
Throne villages